Podpeč ob Dravinji is a settlement in the Municipality of Slovenske Konjice in eastern Slovenia. It lies on the right bank of the Dravinja River east of Loče under the northern slopes of Mount Ljubično. The area is part of the traditional region of Styria. The municipality is now included in the Savinja Statistical Region.

Name
The name of the settlement was changed from Podpeč to Podpeč ob Dravinji in 1953.

References

External links
Podpeč ob Dravinji at Geopedia

Populated places in the Municipality of Slovenske Konjice